Canton of Marseille – Saint-Barthélemy is a former canton located within the commune of Marseille in the Bouches-du-Rhône department of France. It was created 27 February 2003 by the decree 2003-156 of that date. It was disbanded following the French canton reorganisation which came into effect in March 2015. Its population was 41,363 in 2012.

Elected to represent the canton in the General Council of Bouches-du-Rhône'' : 
 Denis Rossi (PS, 2001-2008)

Area
It was composed of the part of the 14th municipal arrondissement of Marseille not included within the cantons of Marseille - Saint-Just and Marseille - Notre-Dame-Limite.

See also 
 Arrondissement of Marseille
 Cantons of the Bouches-du-Rhône department
 Communes of the Bouches-du-Rhône department

References

Former cantons of Marseille
Marseille - Saint-Barthelemy
2015 disestablishments in France
States and territories disestablished in 2015
2003 establishments in France